A bindle is the bag, sack, or carrying device stereotypically used by the American sub-culture of hobos. The bindle is colloquially known as the blanket stick, particularly within the Northeastern hobo community.

A hobo who carried a bindle was known as a bindlestiff. According to James Blish in his novel, A Life for the Stars, a bindlestiff was specifically a hobo who had stolen another hobo's bindle, from the colloquium stiff, as in steal. 

In modern popular culture the bindle is portrayed as a stick with cloth or a blanket tied around one end for carrying items, with the entire array being carried over the shoulder. This transferred force to the shoulder, which allowed a longer-lasting and comfortable grip, especially with larger heavier loads.  Particularly in cartoons, the bindles' sacks usually have a polka-dot or bandanna design. However, in actual use the bindle can take many forms.

One example of the stick-type bindle can be seen in the illustration entitled The Runaway created by Norman Rockwell for the cover of the September 20, 1958, edition of The Saturday Evening Post. This depiction has led to a standard in modern cartoons for if a character runs away.

Though bindles are virtually gone, they are still widely seen in popular culture as a prevalent anachronism. 

The term bindle may descend from the German word Bündel, meaning something wrapped up in a blanket and bound by cord for carrying (cf. originally Middle Dutch bundel), or have arisen as a portmanteau of bind and spindle.

Powder packet
Bindle is also a term used in forensics. It is the name for a piece of paper folded into an envelope or packet to hold trace evidence: hairs, fibers or powders. Similarly, bindle is sometimes used to describe a small package of powdered drugs.

See also
 Carrying pole
 Sarcina

References

External links

 “Folding a Paper Bindle”, 2017, National Forensic Technology Training Center.
 “Paper Evidence Fold”, 2014, VDFS, Virginia.

Bags
Luggage
Forensic equipment